Ripcord Games was a video game publisher and an entertainment software label of Panasonic Interactive Media based in Santa Clara, California.

Games published by Ripcord Games
Armor Command
Enemy Infestation
Forced Alliance
Return Fire 2
Postal
Shrapnel: Urban Warfare 2025 
Space Bunnies Must Die!
Spec Ops: Rangers Lead the Way
Spec Ops: Ranger Team Bravo
Spec Ops II: Green Berets
Spec Ops: Omega Squad
Stratosphere: Conquest of the Skies
Terra Victus

Cancelled
Legend of the Blademasters

References

External links
MobyGames
IGN
Official site (Internet Archive)

Video game publishers
Video game companies of the United States